Chersonesia niceville is an Indomalayan butterfly of the family Nymphalidae (Cyrestinae). It is found in Sumatra and  Peninsular Malaya.

References

External links
  pdf Martin, 1903, Dt. ent. Z. Iris 16 (1): 158

Cyrestinae
Butterflies described in 1895